Live at the Isle of Wight Festival 1970 is a live album by the Moody Blues that consists of their live performance at the Isle of Wight Festival in 1970. The album was released in 2008.

Track listing

 "Gypsy (Of a Strange and Distant Time)" (Justin Hayward) – 3:27
 "The Sunset" (Mike Pinder) – 5:51
 "Tuesday Afternoon" (Hayward) – 3:25
 "Minstrel's Song" (John Lodge) – 4:53
 "Never Comes the Day" (Hayward) – 4:05
 "Tortoise and the Hare" (Lodge) – 3:56
 "Question" (Hayward) – 5:21
 "Melancholy Man" (Pinder) – 5:59
 "Are You Sitting Comfortably?" (Hayward, Ray Thomas) – 4:00
 "The Dream" (Graeme Edge) – 0:59
 "Have You Heard Part. 1" (Pinder) – 1:21
 "The Voyage" (Pinder) – 3:41 
 "Have You Heard Part. 2" (Pinder) – 2:40
 "Nights in White Satin" (Hayward) – 6:19
 "Legend of a Mind" (Thomas) – 7:10
 "Ride My See Saw" (Lodge) – 4:57

Personnel
Justin Hayward – vocals, guitars, sitar
John Lodge – vocals, bass
Ray Thomas – vocals, flute, tambourine
Graeme Edge – drums
Mike Pinder – vocals, mellotron

References

The Moody Blues live albums
2008 live albums